Mustafa Bag Sahebqran with pen name of Kurdi was a nineteenth century Kurdish poet. Along with Nali and Salem, he is among the founders of Babani school of poetry, which was in Central Kurdish. He lived around the same time as Nali and Salem and was from Sulaimaniyah as well. He was born in 1806 or 1812 and died in 1850.

Poetry 
The form and content of his poetry was similar to Nali and Salim, mosting consisting themes such as love, philosophy, mysticism and history. Most of his poems are in the form of Ghazal and Qasidas. His poems are in Kurdish, Persian and Arabic.

References 

Iraqi Kurdish poets
19th-century poets of Ottoman Iraq